"My Lovin' (You're Never Gonna Get It)" is a song by American pop/R&B group En Vogue, released in March 1992 as the lead single from their multi-platinum second album, Funky Divas (1992). The single reached number two on the US Billboard Hot 100, becoming their joint highest-peaking single on the chart alongside "Hold On" and "Don't Let Go (Love)", and it peaked atop the Billboard Hot R&B Singles chart for two weeks. Internationally, the song reached number four in the United Kingdom and peaked within the top 10 on the charts of Canada, Ireland, and the Netherlands.

The single was certified gold in the US by the Recording Industry Association of America for sales/shipments of over 500,000 units. VH1 ranked it number 43 on its list for the "100 Greatest Songs of the '90s".

Production
"My Lovin'" contains a sample of the guitar riff from the James Brown song "The Payback", which is looped throughout the entire song and forms the basis of the melody. The song features Maxine Jones and Dawn Robinson on lead vocals. In a 1992 article, En Vogue mentioned this was one of the last songs they recorded for Funky Divas, which resulted in its release as a single so close to the album's release date.

Chart performance
"My Lovin'" was the group's fourth number-one on the Hot R&B Singles charts, occupying the position for two weeks. It debuted on the US Billboard Hot 100 singles chart at number 71 on the week of March 21, 1992, and jumped to number 47 the following week. The single peaked at number two on the week of May 16, 1992, where it remained for three consecutive weeks. It remained in the top 10 for 13 weeks and in the top 40 for 22 weeks.

"My Lovin'" reached number four on the UK Singles Chart due to a performance of the single by En Vogue on the UK music show Top Of The Pops, becoming the group's highest-charting single there. In addition, it reached number nine in Ireland, number 10 in Canada and the Netherlands, and number 11 in New Zealand.

Critical reception
Upon the release, Larry Flick from Billboard viewed it as a "slinky pop/funk trinket that wraps its signature harmonies with Chic-style guitars, jazzy flute fills, and a muscular bass line." A reviewer from Cash Box stated that En Vogue "has returned in full thrust", and noted further that "it's needless to say that the vocal arrangements are outstanding, because you should already know that. The musical production is also above average and featured is a catchy James Brown sample." Glenn Kenny from Entertainment Weekly remarked that it "has a cool, mantra-like hook." Dave Sholin from the Gavin Report stated that "this San Francisco Bay Area foursome clearly demonstrates that their dazzling 1990 debut was only a glimmer of their potential. Writers/producers Thomas McElroy and Denzil Foster provide the material and these Funky Divas do the rest. What harmony! What grace! They just don't make them any sweeter." Connie Johnson from Los Angeles Times felt "My Lovin'" "owes a debt to the rugged, rhythmic edge of Brown's "The Payback" to underline its sassy message." 

Davydd Chong from Music Weeks RM Dance Update declared it as "a sassy combination of lubricated basslines, airy flutes and their trademark, close harmonies, and it's just as funky as 'Hold On'." Gerald Martinez from New Sunday Times called it "a funky workout featuring swooping harmonies with a dazzling a capella jazz-swing breakdown midway". Parry Gettelman from Orlando Sentinel complimented its "glorious, spun-sugar a cappella harmonies". He felt "My Lovin'" "is as assertive and self-assured as it is fast and funky", and noted that the dynamics "are nice and sneaky". A reviewer from People Magazine said the track "should shimmy up the charts nicely." Danyel Smith from Rolling Stone viewed songs like "My Lovin'" as "filler made listenable only by the girls' "sweet, strong singing - the songs should never have made the cut." Adam Higginbotham from Select constated that here, Funky Divas "lives up to its title". Cheo H. Coker from Stanford Daily stated that "it's typical (meaning funkee) En Vogue; soulful, impassioned singing matched with a hip-hop groove that won't upset the sensibilities of the hardcore hip-hop fan." 

Retrospective review
In an 2017 retrospective review, Quentin Harrison from Albumism noted the "soul sass" of the song. AllMusic editor Jose F. Promis felt that it "combined perfect harmonies, street sass, and 1990s female assertion to create one of the biggest hits of 1992, as well as a catch phrase which became ubiquitous in popular culture." Another editor, Stephen Thomas Erlewine, described it as "swaggering". Daryl Easlea for BBC in 2009 noted its "pop sensibility". Christine Werthman from Complex said the song "isn’t some polite rejection; it’s a hope-the-door-hits-your-ass-on-your-way-out tell-off. “Maybe next time, you’ll give your woman a little respect,” Robinson taunts. That just as well may have been an R-E-S-P-E-C-T as the four divas say everything the Chiffons never could." In an 2020 retrospective review, Pop Rescue declared it as "a masterpiece!" Laura Checkoway from Vibe wrote that on the song, En Vogue was "sassy" and "assertive".

Music video
The accompanying music video for the song was directed by Matthew Rolston in February 1992. The video features the group singing the song, intercut with footage of two male back-up dancers, clad in zentai, dancing. The video was inspired by the scene "Big Spender" from the musical Sweet Charity.

Impact and legacy
The Village Voice listed the song number 37 in their list of "Top Singles of the 90's" in 1999.

Blender put "My Lovin'" at 148th place on their list of "500 Greatest Songs Since You Were Born" in 2005. They wrote: "Before En Vogue, girl-group harmonies hadn't been heard in such force on the pop charts for three decades. With Dawn Robinson singing lead, this was a female-empowerment anthem that would have done Lilith Fair proud-the repeated harmonized chanting of "You're never gonna get it" was a kiss-off par excellence. The song-and the group-were anachronisms. It was unprocessed feistiness and sass, just before hip-hop took out a monopoly on swagger."

Pitchfork Media named it the 166th best track of the 1990s, commenting that "With simmering (not shimmering) James Brown guitars, fidgety new-jack beats, and tightly harmonized "ooh BOP"s, funky divas Cindy Herron, Maxine Jones, Terry Ellis, and Dawn Robinson gave the Sister Act era its "Respect"."

Slant Magazine ranked the song No. 39 in its "The 100 Best Singles of the 1990s"-list in 2011. Billboard named the song No. 6 on their list of "100 Greatest Girl Group Songs of All Time".

Accolades

Awards and nominations

Track listing
 US 12-inch single "My Lovin'" (Theo's Cheaptrick remix) – 6:46
 "My Lovin'" (Radio Active)  – 4:50
 "My Lovin'" (The Morning After dub) – 5:37
 "My Lovin'" (Hyperradio)  – 5:13

 UK CD single "My Lovin'" (radio edit) – 4:16
 "My Lovin'" (extended) – 5:03
 "My Lovin'" (LP version) – 4:44
 "My Lovin'" (extended edit) – 4:11

 US CD single'
 "My Lovin'" (Radio Active #2) – 4:41
 "My Lovin'" (Hyper radio mix)  – 5:12
 "My Lovin'" (Theo's Cheaptrick remix)  – 4:41

Personnel
 Production – Denzil Foster, Thomas McElroy 
 Remixing – Theo Mizuhara
 Executive production – Denzil Foster, Thomas McElroy

Charts and certifications

Weekly charts

Year-end charts

Certifications

Release history

See also
 List of number-one R&B singles of 1992 (U.S.)

References

External links
 "My Lovin' (You're Never Gonna Get It)" - amazon
 "My Lovin'" - US Cassette Single - Discogs

1992 singles
1992 songs
East West Records singles
En Vogue songs
Music videos directed by Matthew Rolston
Songs written by Denzil Foster
Songs written by Thomas McElroy